Microholograms are a technology for moving holographic protection to the level of primary material (substrate). 

Documents, products, seals or other items can be equipped with a hologram. The hologram is expected to ensure anti-counterfeit protection because it can be neither copied nor imitated (provided that advanced technology has been used for hologram origination).  Holograms are considered the strongest anti-counterfeit measure available. Connecting of a hologram with the protected item is a critical task, and there are many specific technologies for it. 
Microholograms enable to protect material (substrate)l for a production of documents, stamps, products, etc. Tiny metallic particles of the size from 40 micrometers to half a millimeter are blended into plastic, paper, foil, etc. There is a complete hologram on each particle. 

Microholograms are always tailored for a particular organization, such as a bank, government, and premium goods producer. The organization decides about their:
Shape (often hexagon or square),
Hologram means visual effects, 
Letters engraved into each particle.
Application machines for production holographic substrates are available in the market. Using such substrate enriched with microholograms enables producers to implement anti-counterfeit protection at several levels.

Microholograms appear as metallic dust to a naked eye. However, an alarmed user can go deeper and inspect a document with a magnifier seeing their regular shape, engraved letters, and holographic surface. If suspicion persists, it is possible to go even deeper and watch microholograms with a microscope, checking complete hologram with all visual effects and perhaps specific forensic features. 

Microholograms were invented by the anti-counterfeit research organization, OPTAGLIO,  in 2004.

Sources
Article from holography news
Description of microholograms on OPTAGLIO web site
Technický týdeník (in  Czech)

Money forgery